In Greek mythology, Phlegyas (Ancient Greek: Φλεγύας means 'fiery') was a king of the Lapiths (or the Phlegyans).

Family
Phlegyas was the son of Ares and Chryse, daughter of Halmus, or of Dotis. He was the brother of Ixion, another king of the Lapiths, and Gyrton, eponym of a Thessalian town.

Phlegyas was the father of Ixion, in some accounts, as well as Coronis, one of Apollo's lovers. The girl's mother was called Cleopheme, daughter of Malus and the Muse Erato. According to one tradition, he had no children. Another daughter, Gyrtone, was also said to gave her name to Gyrton.

Mythology
Phlegyas succeeded Eteocles, who died without issue, in the government of the district of Orchomenos, which he called after himself Phlegyantis.

While pregnant with Asclepius, Coronis fell in love with Ischys, son of Elatus. When a hooded crow informed Apollo of the affair, he sent his sister Artemis to kill Coronis, unable to perform the task himself. However, Hermes rescued the baby from Coronis' womb and gave it to the centaur Chiron to raise. Phlegyas, angry at Apollo for killing his daughter, torched the Apollonian temple at Delphi, causing Apollo to kill him with his arrows and condemn him to severe punishment in the lower world. In another version of the myth, Phlegyas had no children and the two brothers Lycus and Nycteus are responsible for his death.

In the Aeneid of Virgil, Phlegyas is shown tormented in Tartarus in the Underworld, warning others not to despise the gods. In the Thebaid of Statius, Phlegyas is also shown to be in the Underworld entombed in a rock by Megaera (one of the Furies) and starved in front of an eternal feast (comparable to the torment of Tantalus).

Other appearances
 In the Divine Comedy poem Inferno, Phlegyas ferries Virgil and Dante across the river Styx which is portrayed as a marsh where the wrathful and sullen lie within Hell's Circle of Anger. Phlegyas was the mythical ancestor of the Phlegyans.
 Phlegyas appears in the video game Dante's Inferno. This version became a gigantic fiery rock monster following his death. Dante unknowingly rides across the Styx on the wrathful demigod's crown. After fighting his way towards Dis and seeing Beatrice become Lucifer's bride, Dante takes control of Phlegyas and uses him to break into the City of Dis. When Dante reaches the circle of Heresy, Phlegyas breaks the ground he's standing on. Dante manages to jump off in time, but Phlegyas breaks through the floor and plummets into the abyss.
 In the animated film based on the video game called Dante's Inferno: An Animated Epic, the appearance of Phlegyas (whose vocal effects are provided by Kevin Michael Richardson) is more toned down as he appears in the film as a green-skinned humanoid who willingly took Dante and Virgil through the fifth circle of Hell without incident. He was knocked out by Lucifer when Dante controlled Phlegyas to charge Lucifer.

Notes

References 
 John Tzetzes, Book of Histories, Book IX-X translated by Jonathan Alexander from the original Greek of T. Kiessling's edition of 1826.  Online version at theio.com
 Maurus Servius Honoratus, In Vergilii carmina comentarii. Servii Grammatici qui feruntur in Vergilii carmina commentarii; recensuerunt Georgius Thilo et Hermannus Hagen. Georgius Thilo. Leipzig. B. G. Teubner. 1881. Online version at the Perseus Digital Library.
 Pausanias, Description of Greece with an English Translation by W.H.S. Jones, Litt.D., and H.A. Ormerod, M.A., in 4 Volumes. Cambridge, MA, Harvard University Press; London, William Heinemann Ltd. 1918. Online version at the Perseus Digital Library
 Pausanias, Graeciae Descriptio. 3 vols. Leipzig, Teubner. 1903.  Greek text available at the Perseus Digital Library.
 Pindar, Odes translated by Diane Arnson Svarlien. 1990. Online version at the Perseus Digital Library.
 Pindar, The Odes of Pindar including the Principal Fragments with an Introduction and an English Translation by Sir John Sandys, Litt.D., FBA. Cambridge, MA., Harvard University Press; London, William Heinemann Ltd. 1937. Greek text available at the Perseus Digital Library.
 Pseudo-Apollodorus, The Library with an English Translation by Sir James George Frazer, F.B.A., F.R.S. in 2 Volumes, Cambridge, MA, Harvard University Press; London, William Heinemann Ltd. 1921. Online version at the Perseus Digital Library. Greek text available from the same website.
 Publius Papinius Statius, The Thebaid translated by John Henry Mozley. Loeb Classical Library Volumes. Cambridge, MA, Harvard University Press; London, William Heinemann Ltd. 1928. Online version at the Topos Text Project.
 Publius Papinius Statius, The Thebaid. Vol I-II. John Henry Mozley. London: William Heinemann; New York: G.P. Putnam's Sons. 1928. Latin text available at the Perseus Digital Library.
 Strabo, The Geography of Strabo. Edition by H.L. Jones. Cambridge, Mass.: Harvard University Press; London: William Heinemann, Ltd. 1924. Online version at the Perseus Digital Library.
 Strabo, Geographica edited by A. Meineke. Leipzig: Teubner. 1877. Greek text available at the Perseus Digital Library.
 The Homeric Hymns and Homerica with an English Translation by Hugh G. Evelyn-White. Homeric Hymns. Cambridge, MA.,Harvard University Press; London, William Heinemann Ltd. 1914. Online version at the Perseus Digital Library. Greek text available from the same website.

External links

Kings of the Lapiths
Lapiths in Greek mythology
Condemned souls in Tartarus
Children of Ares
Demigods in classical mythology
Characters in Book VI of the Aeneid
Minyan characters in Greek mythology
Thessalian characters in Greek mythology
Minyan mythology
Thessalian mythology